Phrynobatrachus ghanensis, or the Ghana river frog, is a species of frogs in the family Petropedetidae. It is found in southern Ghana (type locality, the Kakum National Park, and Bobiri) and southeastern Ivory Coast. It is an inconspicuous forest floor species inhabiting swampy primary rainforest, although it has also been found by small temporary pools in bamboo forest and close to forest edges. Presumably, it is threatened by habitat loss.

References

ghanensis
Amphibians of West Africa
Amphibians described in 1964
Taxa named by Arne Schiøtz
Taxonomy articles created by Polbot